Calophyllum cordato-oblongum is a species of flowering plant in the Calophyllaceae family. It is found only in Sri Lanka.

References

Endemic flora of Sri Lanka
Vulnerable plants
cordato-oblongum
Taxonomy articles created by Polbot